Star Wars Transformers is a Hasbro toy line started in 2006. The line features robot versions of various characters from the Star Wars franchise that transform into vehicles from the same series.

The toy characters' factions include bounty hunters, the Galactic Empire, the Galactic Republic, the Rebel Alliance, and the Separatists. According to Hasbro, the vehicles from Shadows of the Empire are not used because the toy line targets collectors who are mostly familiar with the film series and the Clone Wars animated series.

In late 2017, TakaraTomy announced a reboot of the line with new designs and higher price points to begin in March 2018 starting with Darth Vader, who transforms into a TIE Advanced X1.

Critical reaction
Merging both franchise's toy lines was "a natural fit". In 2007, Toyfare magazine called the Han Solo and Chewbacca figures—which combine to create the Millennium Falcon—the 23rd top toy released in the previous 10 years. In 2006, the toy was voted the #9 toy of the year by FamilyFun Magazine.

References

External links

Star Wars Transformers article at Transformers Wiki

Star Wars vehicles
Transforming toy robots
Transformers (toy line)
Products introduced in 2006
Products introduced in 2018